The minister of state for energy and climate is a mid-level position in the Department for Energy Security and Net Zero in the Government of the United Kingdom. It is currently held by Graham Stuart.

The role used to be part of the portfolio belonging to the secretary of state and minister of state at the Department of Energy and Climate Change.

Until 2023, the minister worked at the Department for Business, Energy and Industrial Strategy.

History 
The role was formerly known as Minister of State for Energy at the Department of Energy and Climate Change.

Anne-Marie Trevelyan replaced Kwasi Kwarteng as Minister of State for Business, Energy and Clean Growth at the Department for Business, Energy and Industrial Strategy in January 2021.

Greg Hands replaced Trevelyan at the 2021 British cabinet reshuffle.

Responsibilities 
The minister is responsible for the following:

 carbon budgets
 green finance
 energy efficiency and heat, including fuel poverty
 clean heat
 low carbon generation
 energy retail markets
 oil and gas, including shale gas
 security of supply
 electricity and gas wholesale markets and networks
 international energy
 EU energy and climate
 energy security, including resilience and emergency planning

List of Ministers of State

Notes

References

See also 

 List of government ministers of the United Kingdom
Minister of State at the Department of Energy and Climate Change
 Energy minister

Department for Business, Energy and Industrial Strategy
Business in the United Kingdom
Energy in the United Kingdom
Ministerial offices in the United Kingdom
Energy ministers
Climate change in the United Kingdom
Climate change policy in the United Kingdom